"Falling Like the Stars" is a song by British singer-songwriter James Arthur. It was released as a digital download and for streaming on 10 May 2019, as the third single from Arthur's third album You. The song peaked at number 25 on the UK Singles Chart and was written by James Arthur, Anders Albin Höjer, Jamie Grey and produced by Bradley Spence and Alex Beitzke.

Background
In an interview with iHeartRadio, Arthur said: "This song perfectly represents what I do best, I think," Arthur told iHeartRadio of the tune. "I think that's the why it became the front runner to be the next single of this particular album. The core of the album has got that classic James Arthur acoustic, honest thing going on."

Music video
A music video to accompany the release of "Falling Like the Stars" was first released onto YouTube on 24 May 2019 at a total length of four minutes and fifteen seconds. The video has 25 million views as of December 2019.

Track listing

Charts

Certifications

Release history

References

2019 singles
2019 songs
Columbia Records singles
James Arthur songs
Songs written by James Arthur
Pop ballads